Beate Schippmann (born December 28, 1959 Hamburg) is a German para table tennis athlete . She won a silver medal at the Paralympics.

Career 
At the 1996 Summer Paralympics, in Atlanta, she competed in Women's Singles 3, and Women's Open 1–5.

At the 2000 Summer Paralympics, in Sydney, she won a silver medal in Women's Teams 1–3. She competed in Women's Singles 3.

Beate Schippmann is one of the most successful German wheelchair table tennis players, with various European championship titles, and various German championship titles. Beate Schippmann won her last German championship title in 2017 at the age of 57 after a long break.  She was successful in singles as well as in doubles with her longtime playing partner Monica Bartheidel.

Beate Schippmann is still active in the league today as a player and as a youth coach.  In addition, she has volunteered for many years in the prevention of violence and against sexual abuse.

References 

1959 births
Living people
Sportspeople from Hamburg
Paralympic silver medalists for Germany
Paralympic table tennis players of Germany
German female table tennis players
Table tennis players at the 1996 Summer Paralympics
Table tennis players at the 2000 Summer Paralympics
Medalists at the 2000 Summer Paralympics